Bernadette Belle Wu Ong is a Singaporean actress, emcee, model, and beauty pageant titleholder who was appointed as Miss Universe Singapore 2020. She represented Singapore at Miss Universe 2020.

Personal life
Ong was born and raised in the Philippines to Chinese parents. Her family moved to Singapore when she was 10 and later on, she studied in Australia.

Pageantry 
Ong competed in the Miss Universe Singapore in 2019. She also won the title Miss Charm Singapore 2019 and later represented Singapore in Miss Charm International 2019. She was handpicked to compete at Miss Universe 2020, which is delayed due to the COVID-19 pandemic and will be held on 16 May 2021.

References

External links 

 

Living people
Miss Universe 2020 contestants
Singaporean people of Filipino descent
Singaporean beauty pageant winners
1990s births